Fate/Extra (stylized as Fate/EXTRA) is a dungeon crawler role-playing game developed by Type-Moon and Imageepoch and published by Marvelous Entertainment for the PlayStation Portable. The game takes place in a parallel universe to the visual novel Fate/stay night. It was released in Japan on July 22, 2010. Aksys Games localized the game for North America and released it on November 21, 2011. Three editions of the game were released in North America: a Limited Edition, a retail standard edition, and a PlayStation Network downloadable version. On January 19, 2012, Ghostlight announced their plans to release the game in PAL territories.

Fate/Extra was followed by a companion game, Fate/Extra CCC. Instead of being a direct sequel, CCC is described as an alternate route of the Extra storyline's development. The opening movie of CCC was directed by Akiyuki Shinbo and produced by Shaft.

The game was followed by Fate/Extella in 2016. An anime adaptation of the first game was produced by Shaft and aired on Tokyo MX and affiliate stations from January 28 to July 29, 2018.

As of 2020, a remake, Fate/Extra Record, is being developed by Type-Moon Studio BB and will be released on "Current Generation" consoles at an unspecified date.

Gameplay

Fate/Extra is a single-player three-dimensional Japanese role-playing game in the dungeon subgenre. The game features two main modes: "Arena", in which the player fights against AI opponents, and "Academy", which is storyline-driven.

During battles, the player's character, called the Master, directs their Servant to reduce their opponent's health points to zero. Battles take place as isolated in-game events with a single opponent (either a dweller or another Servant). A fight consists of separate sections, and before each of them begins, the Master is asked to select a sequence of six actions for the Servant to execute on the playing field while the enemy retaliates.

There are three main types of interaction: "Attack", "Protection", and "Breakthrough". After the series of actions are chosen by each side of the battle, they are compared against each other before the defeated side is damaged. In the case of three consecutive successful actions, the character is provided with an additional attack that does not take into account the resistance of the enemy. In addition to the main interactions, servant characters have special types of attacks called "noble phantasms", which require the expenditure of magic energy points.

During a battle a Master can maintain their Servant with the help of "permanent effect" items and "code spells" — magic that enhances certain characteristics of the Servants.

The arena is a dungeon filled with AI enemies. When all enemies are defeated, the player is rewarded experience points and in-game currency. During one game week, the player is offered two mandatory quests, consisting of finding items in the territory of Arena levels. If these missions are completed within the prescribed period, the player is allowed to battle with an enemy servant controlled by artificial intelligence at the beginning of the next game week. When a certain number of battles are held with a certain type of opponent, the player gets the opportunity to see part of the opponent's action combination before choosing their own series of moves. Throughout the game week, the player can gain info on enemy servants thought their interactions with their master in the academy. The player may also purchase items in the academy.

The dialogue system in the game is built similar to the visual novel genre, where there is an extensive system for selecting replicas that further develop the relationship with the Servant. The main narration is also conducted through text information offered to the player, located between the stages of the active game process. If a quest is failed or a Servant is defeated in the arena, the player receives a "bad ending".

Plot 

Protagonist Hakuno Kishinami wakes up in a strange virtual world with no recollection of the past and finds themselves forced to fight for survival in a war they do not understand for a prize beyond value: the opportunity to have one's wish granted. With only an enigmatic "Servant" by their side, they face both friends and foes in battles to the death to not only gain possession of a mysterious object known as the "Holy Grail", but also to find the answer to the most important question of all: "Who am I?"

In addition to characters from Fate/stay night, characters from other Type-Moon works and new ones were added to the game.  While familiar characters from Fate/stay night and other Type-Moon works appear, they have many differences from their original iterations. For these familiar characters, the game uses different voice actors from their Fate/stay night lookalikes.

Characters

Masters

Hakuno is the protagonist of Fate/Extra. He or she is the Master of Saber, Caster, or Archer, depending on who is chosen in the game. The gender of Hakuno is also unspecified, and chosen by the player at the start. 

A member of the Resistance who joined the Grail War to stop the Harwey family. Master of Lancer, Cú Chulainn.

Homunculus created by the world's last alchemist. Master of Berserker, Lu Bu. She is encountered on the second floor and assisted Hakuno and Nero.

Leader of the plutocracy that owns 60% of the world's wealth and the strongest Master. Master of Saber, Gawain.

Gaming champion of Asia of 2030 and best friend of the protagonist. Master of Rider, Francis Drake.

Knight of England who was sent to the Grail War to win the Moon Cell. Master of Archer, Robin Hood. Antagonist of the second floor.

Cyber ghost of a little girl who is already dead, but her soul connected to the Moon Cell. Master of Caster, Alice.

Illegitimate older brother of Leo, an assassin sent to ensure that Leo will win. Master of Assassin, Li Shuwen.

A zealot who mixes various religions and views his Servant as his god. Master of Berserker, Arcueid Brunestud.

A twisted woman who only wants to eat things she loves, like her pet, parents, and even her own child. Master of Lancer, Vlad III.

Participant who hides in her room instead of fighting in the Grail War. Appears in Fate/Extra CCC. Master of Lancer, Karna.

A man who wishes for the perpetuation of war for the continued advancement of mankind. Master of Saver, Buddha.

Main Servants
 – 

Nero is the lead heroine in Fate/Extra.

 – 
 (Japanese)

 – 
 (Japanese)

 (Japanese)
Only in Fate/EXTRA CCC.

Other Servants
 – 

 – 

 – 

 – 

 – 

 – 

 – 

 – 

 – 

 – 

 – 

 – 

 – 

 – 

 – 

 – 

 – 

 –

Others

Development
Type-Moon producer Kazuya Niinō joined Imageepoch through CEO Ryo Mikagi to collaborate on a project. Soon, Niinō contacted Kinoko Nasu and Takashi Takeuchi for a proposed collaboration on the development of a new game in the Fate Series, which, according to the producer, was to implement various genres. At the time, Type-Moon was involved in the finalization on Fate/hollow ataraxia, and had short-term plans to develop other projects – for which Nasu was forced to refuse the role as producer.

Despite the failure, Niinō did not abandon the idea of creating a new game, and in 2007, prepared a more detailed proposal: a Japanese role-playing game, with a plot for a fundamentally new Holy Grail War not related to the events of Fate/stay night. The basis of the work and themes is set in the near future with the setting on the Moon, which was previously briefly mentioned by Nasu as an element of the Tsukihime series. In addition, a supercomputer controlling the work of the Holy Grail within the virtual reality world, in which protagonists would be placed. Due to the peculiarities of the setting, Kazuya decided to make a role-playing game with a lot of textual information, akin to the visual novel series. The producers chose 3D graphics and seamless transition plans from a third party. To oppose the product to the rest of the Fate franchise, Kazuya invited a third-party artist working under the pseudonym Arco Wada to design the characters, despite the fact that Takeuchi did all character illustrations for previous Type-Moon games. Wada was commissioned to create an outwardly similar character to provoke the audience which kept about "30% of the original design". Niinō indicated to Wada that the Roman emperor Nero should become the historical prototype of the main heroic Servant. The original sketch, made to imitate Takeuchi's style, was rejected, and Niinō insisted on depicting the character in Wada's own style without unnecessary detail. When Type-Moon leaders received a new offer from Niinō, they planned to stop the expansion of the Fate franchise and move to work on new projects. However, they considered the possibility of developing a role-playing game based on the visual novel since the creation of Fate/stay night, as they were fans of the genre and considered the elements of the setting of the Fate universe suitable for such a project. As such, Nasu and Takeuchi's new project was approved due to its spin-off status from the original game.

After the concept was approved, Niinō divided game development between two developers: Type-Moon, whose script and character design were supervised by Nasu and Takeuchi respectively; and Imageepoch, who assigned Shuetsu Kadowaki to be the head of program and create game mechanics, assigned to the head of programming. The producer himself reserved the connection between the creators and the control over individual plotlines.

Within Imageepoch, there were various ideas on the implementation of game mechanics, such as building gameplay fighting scenes by analogy with fighting, as well as complicated non-transitive balance system that consist of six different character actions. Unlike other representatives of the Fate franchise, both offensive and defensive skills were developed for each character, as the developers considered it necessary to "not only to reduce health points of the opponent but also to save their own" in order to keep the player's attention in the game. Niinō and Kadowaki originally decided to use mechanics similar to rock paper scissors before realizing that it would not really interest the audience. In the end, they decided to develop a system of collecting information about the enemy to significantly improve the chances of winning fights and presented as in-game events, by analogy with the servants' status screen that is gradually filling with data in Fate/stay night . More attention was given to the development of individual characters and the overall development of the story instead of focusing on game aspects. Unique joint actions in battle mode were intended to be used for various combinations of Masters and Servants, which were not implemented in the final project.

Niinō thought it was necessary to offer three playable Servants (Saber, Archer, and Caster), all of whom differ in different skills, character, and difficulty. Despite the declared independence of the story, the concept of secondary characters in the story was based on similarities with the characters of Fate/stay night, some of whom were given the same names as in the visual novel, though developers claimed that their personalities and the histories were not identical to their prototypes. To emphasize this, some of them were asked to change the kanji in names, which was ultimately not implemented. For the first time since Sasaki Kojiro was used as a servant in Fate/stay night, the ban on introducing Far Eastern characters as Servants was lifted and has made it possible for add characters like Lü Bu and Li Shuwen.

Initially, Nasu doubted the possibility of realizing Nero's personality as the basis for Saber's heroine, and the creators considered other versions of the character's prototype. Although the initial decision was left unchanged, the character's personality drastically changed to care about his environment and his love interest. The second available character to choose was Archer, whose personality and appearance were kept by Niinō and Wada. They believed that this hero "should always look cool" and visually increased his masculinity. The third character, Caster, caused the greatest difficulties as Niinō suggested designing her as an adult woman with animal ears. The original design of the heroine was conceived by Takeuchi as a mixture of Japanese costume and Chinese traditional clothing Hanfu; the facial features and hairstyle were created under the impression of Yoko's character in Gurren Lagann. In an interview, Wada said the reason she drew anthropomorphic characters, especially Caster, was because she liked animal ears and found them to be very cute.

According to Takeuchi, Niinō personally developed the central storyline of the game while Nasu translated his ideas into text. Compared to previous franchise products, a new servant class was added – Saver, whose true identity is based on Shakyamuni Buddha as the final boss and Grail Defender. After the game's release, Niinō noted that he was not able to concentrate enough on dramatic aspects of the plot; in response, Nasu focused on daily school life. The scriptor's campaign setting turned out to be a capitalist and stagnant utopia, and the Holy Grail war was used to select masters that would use the artifact's properties for the common good, not personal fulfillment.

Seiyuu casting was done by Nasu, Takeuchi, and Niinō. The same cast involved in Type-Moon's previous work was approved. Saber's role was given to Sakura Tange, who had voiced the protagonist in Cardcaptor Sakura.

Release
The game was first announced in the September 2009 issue of Famitsu and was released for the PlayStation Portable in both the regular and "Type-Moon Box" editions; the latter included a Saber Figma figure from the game, a visual book and a limited edition soundtrack. While the original release was planned for March 2010, the release date was pushed back to July 22, 2010, for further development.

In July 2011, Aksys Games confirmed it would be publishing the game in North America. The North American Limited Edition included the special 15-page Fate Visual Works Art book and the 11 song Limited Soundtrack from the "Type-Moon Box"" edition. In January 2012, Ghostlight announced their plans to release the game in PAL territories. The four-volume drama CD series Sound Drama Fate/EXTRA was also released starting from winter 2012.

A companion game titled Fate/Extra CCC was released on March 28, 2013, in Japan. The official theme song of the second game, is performed by Kanon Wakeshima.

Reception

Fate/Extra

Fate/Extra received mixed reception from critics who viewed it as a work that used Japanese role-playing game and visual novel elements. The reviewers focused on the plot, which was considered to be the element that kept players engaged. They also praised the quality of the text, which, according to Dark Zero observer Dominic Shird, was reminiscent of the game Lost Odyssey . However, in a review for GamePro, Heidi Kemps remarks that as in the case of other Nasu's works, the exposition was prolonged and the manner of transmitting the characters' thoughts corresponded more to traditional visual novels. Other critics also made analogies to the genre and highlighted the decision trees, relationships points between characters, and nonstandard endings. Digital Fix reviewer Lewis Brown thought these visual novel elements were well-implemented, but noted that the story would benefit if it had more dramatic components without everyday school life.

The availability of three different Servants was positively received, and according to some reviewers, encouraged the player to replay the game. However, the need for a New Game Plus mode, according to GameSpot's Shiva Stella, was controversial because of the main story's immutability. Lewis Brown emphasized the use of furigana in the game, including the localized English version, which added semantic nuances to the dialogue. The critics gave high marks from the in-game system for collecting information about enemy servants, which directly influenced the course of the battles by its results, defining battle tactics, which, according to Zack Welhouse from RPGamer, reminded with its atmosphere the novels The Hunger Games and Battle of the King. Welhouse also noted the lack of understanding of the events taking place on the part of the main characters, whose motivations were reduced to taking obligations. In the reviewers' opinions, the prologue of the game was unnecessarily stretched due to the time needed to unlock gameplay elements.

The audio-visual component of the game was well received. GameZone critic Stephanie Carmichael pointed out that the sprites' characters appearing in the dialog box performed well and contributed to the post-battle atmosphere. Reviewers noted the overall character design was reminiscent of anime, seamless transitions from a third-person camera when watching characters  and the design of the "Arena" mode by the standards of Japanese role-playing games in the PlayStation Portable version. However, Dominic Shird suggested that developers should have created more diverse graphic schemes for dungeons instead of constantly using shades of blue; Zack Welhouse also highlighted the same type of monster design.

Fate/Extra, as a role-playing game, was subjected to various criticisms by reviewers who compared it to Persona 3, and Welhouse noted the game (especially the" Arena" mode) took the worst aspects of its predecessor. Reviewers noted the simplicity of Fate/Extra implemented in non-transitive game balance, which, in their opinion, was a direct comparison to rock paper scissors. Critics' opinions are divided in the assessment of battle mechanics to the player's skills: some observers believed it showed a high value of the game experience gained and gathering information about the enemy (which increased the threshold for entering the game), however, others considered this factor meaningless due to the presence of high-level opponents and the inherent randomness in the system. Stephanie Carmichael said the main problem of the gameplay was the intuitively difficult system of countering opponents in battle, which could lead to increased demands on each of the player's actions. The battle phases were considered "quite interesting, but quickly boring" due to the low pace and frequent repetition of opponents. Other shortcomings pointed out were the weakness of some opponents, the inability to skip previously read text and save during the study dungeons, and small rewards for clearing them. The dungeon was criticized for being "boring" and using the same design in all its maps. The size of the world in Fate/Extra was regarded to be small for market console role-playing games.

Various reviewers believed Fate/Extra unsuccessfully tried to "sit on two chairs" when balancing both role-playing game visual novel elements together, and would only have been well-received if either genre was focused on. Kemps said this could have been achieved by recategorizing the game's genre to adventure.

Media

Manga
Three manga adaptations based on the game were released. The first adaptation was written and illustrated by Robi〜na and serialized in Kadokawa Shoten's Comptiq magazine from May 2011 to December 2014, compiling up to 6 tankōbon volumes. The second manga, which adapts the CCC storyline was also written and illustrated by Robi〜na, was also serialized in Kadokawa's Comptiq magazine in July 2015. A spinoff manga titled  was written by Takenokoseijin and serialized in Kadokawa Shoten's Monthly Comp Ace magazine in December 2013.

Anime

An anime adaptation titled  was first announced on March 22, 2016, at the AnimeJapan Fate Project panel to be released in 2017. Shaft was revealed to be handling the animation with Kinoko Nasu returning as the writer. Akiyuki Shinbo and Yukihiro Miyamoto directed the series at Shaft, featuring character designs by Masaaki Takiyama and music composed by Satoru Kōsaki. In March 2017, some artwork revealed the game's male protagonist with Saber. On July 30, Atsushi Abe and Sakura Tange were confirmed to voice Hakuno Kishinami and Saber respectively. The series premiered January 28, 2018, on Tokyo MX, with further broadcasts on Gunma TV, Tochigi TV, BS11, and MBS. Netflix licensed the series for worldwide online streaming before giving the rights to Aniplex of America, who later released the series on Blu-ray in North America.

References

External links

 
 
 
 

2010 video games
2013 video games
Anime television series based on video games
Aniplex
Dungeon crawler video games
Fate/stay night video games
Image Epoch games
Manga based on video games
Netflix original anime
PlayStation Portable games
PlayStation Portable-only games
Seinen manga
Shaft (company)
Tokyo MX original programming
Type-Moon games
Video games developed in Japan
Video games featuring protagonists of selectable gender
Video games scored by Shinji Hosoe
Ghostlight games